Wilton Dean is a village in the Scottish Borders area of Scotland, on the Cala Burn, and close to the River Teviot.           
Along with Stirches and Burnfoot, Scottish Borders, Wilton Dean is now often considered to be a suburb of Hawick which is situated very close to the village.

See also
List of places in the Scottish Borders
List of places in Scotland

External links

RCAHMS record for Hawick, Wilton Dean, General
Borders Family History Society: Wilton Dean
Images of Old Hawick and Wilton Dean

Villages in the Scottish Borders
Hawick